Tū is the debut studio album by New Zealand metal band Alien Weaponry, released on 1 June 2018 by Napalm Records.

Cover artwork

The album's cover artwork was designed by New Zealand designer Barny Bewick. The figure, who the band nicknamed Tū, represents the Māori, Celtic, French and Scandinavian heritage of the bandmembers.

Track listing

Charts

Year-end charts

Personnel
Credits adapted from the Tū album booklet.

Lewis De Jong – guitar, vocals, songwriting, kōauau
Henry De Jong – drums, vocals, songwriting, pūtātara
Simon Gooding – producer (3, 5-8, 11-12), recording (3, 5-8, 11-12)
Hammerhead – producer (3, 5-9, 11-12)
Paddy Hill – recording (4, 10)
Tom Larkin – producer (1-2, 4, 9-10, 13), recording (1)
Hugh Porter – recording (3, 5-8, 11-12)
Scott Seabright – recording (2, 4, 9-10, 13)
Samuel K Sproull – mastering
Ethan Trembath – bass guitar, vocals, songwriting, pūrerehua

References 

2018 debut albums
Napalm Records albums
Alien Weaponry albums
Groove metal albums
Māori-language albums
Albums recorded at Roundhead Studios